Home-stationed at Clay National Guard Center in Marietta, the 78th Aviation Troop Command is the aviation arm of the Georgia Army National Guard.

Mission
The mission of the 78th’s more than 574 pilots, aircrew, maintenance, and support personnel is to mobilize and deploy aviation forces for providing command and control, air movement, and air assault operations in support of combat operations worldwide, as well as to provide aviation support during state and national emergencies in response to homeland defense operations.

Deployments
In December 2010, Company C, 1st Battalion, 185th Aviation Regiment teamed up with soldiers of the 1st Battalion (General Support), 171st Aviation Regiment to provide command, control and communication enhancement, as well as movement of cargo and troops in Iraq. They also deployed to provide aero-medical evacuation coverage to their assigned battle space as U.S. forces in Iraq were transitioning from Operation Iraqi Freedom to Operation New Dawn.

On February 3, 2011, Detachment 1, Company C, 1st Battalion, 111th Aviation Regiment deployed to Fort Hood before heading to Iraq, to begin its yearlong mission of providing MEDEVAC support as part of the Army’s National Guard's Combat Aviation Brigade, 40th Infantry Division (CA ARNG), and the Combat Aviation Brigade, 29th Infantry Division (MD ARNG) to coalition forces involved in Operation New Dawn in Iraq.

Units
The 78th Aviation Troop Command consists of 14 units:

 Company C, 1st Battalion (General Support), 111th Aviation Regiment, Dobbins Air Reserve Base, Marietta, Georgia
 2nd Battalion (Service & Support), 151st Aviation Regiment, Dobbins Air Reserve Base, Marietta, Georgia
 1st Battalion (General Support), 169th Aviation Regiment, Hunter Army Airfield, Savannah, Georgia
 1st Battalion (General Support), 171st Aviation Regiment, Dobbins Air Reserve Base, Marietta, Georgia
 Company H, 171st Aviation Regiment, Dobbins Air Reserve Base, Marietta, Georgia
 1st Battalion, 185th Aviation Regiment, Winder, Georgia
 935th Support Battalion (Aviation), Hunter Army Airfield, Savannah, Georgia
Detachment 9, Operational Airlift, Dobbins Air Reserve Base, Marietta, Georgia
Army Fixed Wing Support Activity, Robins Air Force Base, Warner Robins, Georgia
Army Aviation Support Facility No. 1, Winder Barrow Airport, Winder, Georgia
Army Aviation Support Facility No. 2, Dobbins Air Reserve Base, Marietta, Georgia
Army Aviation Support Facility No. 3, Hunter Army Airfield, Savannah, Georgia

Accomplishments
The 78th Aviation created the C-27J Spartan Joint Cargo Aircraft facility at Robins Air Force Base. Facility personnel successfully supported the first C-27J aircraft qualification courses taught there by New York-based L-3 Communications. Georgia Army National Guard Aviation has been, and remains, integral in the selection and fielding of the C-27J Spartan JCA. In 2010, Company H, 171st Aviation Regiment personnel successfully completed the multi-service operational test and evaluation of the aircraft, thereby completing transfer of the program, on time and budget, to the Georgia Air National Guard.

External links 
 171 Aviation Official Website
 78th Aviation Troop Command's Facebook page

References 

Military units and formations in Georgia (U.S. state)
Troop Commands of the United States Army National Guard